Leptoderma ospesca, the Eastern eel-slickhead, is a species of slickheads found in the Eastern Central Pacific Ocean. Leptoderma ospesca was described by Angulo, C. C. Baldwin & D. R. Robertson, in 2016.  

References

Alepocephalidae
Taxa named by Carole C. Baldwin
Taxa named by David Ross Robertson
Fish described in 2016
Marine fish genera